All India Bank Employees Association (AIBEA) is the oldest and largest national trade union of bank employees in India, was founded in 1946 on the 20th of April in Kolkata.

See also
All India Bank Officers' Association

References

Trade unions in India
Finance sector trade unions of India
All India Trade Union Congress
Trade unions established in 1946